The Man in Evening Clothes (French:Un homme en habit) is a 1931 American pre-Code comedy film directed by René Guissart and starring Fernand Gravey, Diana and Suzy Vernon. It was made by the French subsidiary of Paramount Pictures at the Joinville Studios in Paris. A Spanish-language version A Gentleman in Tails was also released the same year.

Cast
 Fernand Gravey as André de Lussanges  
 Diana as Gaby  
 Suzy Vernon as Germaine de Lussanges  
 Pola Illéry as Totoche  
 Pierre Etchepare as Pierre d'Allouville  
 Louis Baron fils as L'huissier Buffetaut  
 Jany Holt as Ninette 
 Paul Pauley as Le valet de chambre  
 Jeanne Fusier-Gir 
 Alexandre Dréan 
 Marc-Hély 
 Pierrette Caillol 
 Marcel Carpentier 
 Georges Bever 
 Henry Prestat 
 Georges Cahuzac 
 Charlotte Martens 
 Henri Vilbert
 Christian Argentin 
 Francis Mérey 
 Poussard 
 Henri Trévoux 
 André Pollack 
 Henri Jullien
 Henri de Livry

References

Bibliography
 Goble, Alan. The Complete Index to Literary Sources in Film. Walter de Gruyter, 1999.

External links
 

1931 films
1931 comedy films
1930s French-language films
American comedy films
Films directed by René Guissart
Remakes of American films
American multilingual films
Films shot at Joinville Studios
Paramount Pictures films
American films based on plays
Films scored by Casimir Oberfeld
1931 multilingual films
1930s American films